Alexsandro Victor de Souza Ribeiro (born 9 August 1999), known simply as Alexsandro, is a Brazilian professional footballer who plays as a defender for Ligue 1 club Lille.

Career

Alexsandro started his career with Portuguese third tier side Praiense. In 2021, Alexsandro signed for Chaves in the Portuguese second tier, where he made 34 appearances and scored 3 goals, helping them earn promotion to the Portuguese top flight.

In 2022, he signed for French Ligue 1 club Lille.

References

External links
 

1999 births
People from Rio de Janeiro (city)
Amora F.C. players
Association football defenders
Brazilian expatriate footballers
Brazilian expatriate sportspeople in France
Brazilian expatriate sportspeople in Portugal
Brazilian footballers
Campeonato de Portugal (league) players
Expatriate footballers in France
Expatriate footballers in Portugal
G.D. Chaves players
Liga Portugal 2 players
Lille OSC players
Living people
S.C. Praiense players